A Phoenix Too Frequent is a 1957 Australian TV play. It was made by the ABC at a time when Australian drama production was rare. Christopher Fry's play only featured a cast of three so was considered ideal for television production; the ABC filmed it again in 1966.

Premise
A grieving widow in Ancient Greece gradually finds the attractions of a young soldier outweighs her determination to join her husband in the underworld.

Cast
Dinah Shearing as Dynamene
James Condon as Tegeus
Audrey Teesdale as Doto

Production
Thelma Afford did the costumes.

Rehearsal took place at a studio in Darlinghurst. It was the fourth TV production from Paul O'Louglin who used techniques taught him by Rudi Bretz when Bretz visited Australia the previous year.

O'Loughlin said "TV has a lot of problems that don't exist either on the stage or in radio. You have to make every point valid in front of the camera and remember that it goes right into the homes of the audience. There’s none of the large illusion of the theatre. And you have to remember all the time   that you’re working on a very small stage.  You can’t go in for many long shots of crowd scenes, for instance, because the figures look too small to come  to life. But you can create wonderfully intimate effects with close-ups in a way that is never possible on the stage. As in radio, you speak right into the ear of the audience; the whole thing is personal and intimate. That distinguishes it from the cinema."

Audrey Teesdale and Dinah Shearing had acted in a production of the play on stage several years previously at the Mercury Theatre. It was Teesdale's fourth television play.

The production took six weeks to plan and prepare. There was more than 40 hours of rehearsal, 30 hours in a workshop in Darlinghurst, two hours of dress and make up rehearsal at Gore Hill and seven and a half hoses of camera rehearsal. There was also a performance check lasting an hour before the telecast. During that time Desmonde Dowling designed scenery which was built in the workshop and costumes were designed.

1966 Version

There was another Australian version done in Melbourne in 1966, directed by Oscar Whitbread). It aired as part of Wednesday Theatre.

Cast
Lynette Curran as Dynamene
Sean Scully as Tegeus
Fay Kelton as Doto,

References

1950s Australian television plays